Yuncos is a municipality located in the province of Toledo, Castile-La Mancha, Spain. 
According to the 2018 census (INE), the municipality has a population of 10,968. It is the home of Division 1 rugby player Eross Coito-Paz, who played for Brigham Young University.

References

Municipalities in the Province of Toledo